Laurence Alan Bristow (born 18 July 1952) is a British racing driver and businessman, best known for his time in the British Touring Car Championship. He is son of helicopter magnate Alan Bristow.

Racing career

He first started racing in 1985 when he entered the MG Metro Challenge. In 1987 he raced in the Uniroyal Production Car Championship driving a Ford Sierra RS500 where he finished second in class. A year later he stepped up to the BTCC, again driving a class A Ford Sierra RS500. In 1989 he drove for the Labatts team along with team mate Tim Harvey. This year he got his only BTCC win along with Tiff Needell at the Donington Park 1 hour endurance race. Bristow got his highest championship finish of 9th in 1990. When the BTCC switched to the single Super Touring class in 1991, the Labatts team changed to a BMW M3 for two more years with Bristow.

Other racing in 1989 included the British Sportscar Championship and the 24 hours of Le Mans. The 1991 season was sit between the BTCC and the Thundersaloon championship, which Bristow won. In 1993 he left the BTCC and raced in the Thundersaloons full time, back in a Ford Sierra.  He is now director of Bristow Helicopters, following in his father's footsteps.

Racing record

Complete British Touring Car Championship results
(key) (Races in bold indicate pole position – 1988–1990 in class) (Races in italics indicate fastest lap – 1 point awarded ?–1989 in class)

 – Race was stopped due to heavy rain. No points were awarded.

Complete European Touring Car Championship results

(key) (Races in bold indicate pole position) (Races in italics indicate fastest lap)

References

External links
 Official BTCC 1990 Standings

1952 births
Living people
British Touring Car Championship drivers
English racing drivers
24 Hours of Le Mans drivers
BMW M drivers